KMKT  (branded as Katy Country) is an FM radio station playing a country format and operating on frequency 93.1 MHz.

History
KMKT got its start on frequency 104.9 FM in the North Texas region after its sister station KLAK moved to Durant, Oklahoma 1987.

It was first branded as "Katy Klassics" (the initials are a reference to the Missouri–Kansas–Texas Railroad, commonly called the "Katy" railroad), then "Katy Oldies" a year later. Then in 1990, KMKT moved to Bells, Texas and changed format to country music. The 104.9 frequency was dark for 6 years, but later reestablished as KZMP.

The KMKT studios, production facilities and business offices are located at One Grand Centre, 1800 Teague Drive (Suite 300) in Sherman, TX.

External links

93.1 Katy Country's Official Site

Country radio stations in the United States
Alpha Media radio stations